Totino is an Italian surname. Notable people with the surname include:

Rose Totino (1915–1994), American frozen pizza company co-founder
Jim Totino (1911–1981), American frozen pizza company co-founder and husband of Rose Totino
Totino-Grace High School, an American Catholic high school named in their honor
Totino's, an American brand of frozen pizza products currently owned by General Mills
Salvatore Totino (born 1964), American cinematographer

Italian-language surnames